Sir Peter Cook  (born 22 October 1936) is an English architect, lecturer and writer on architectural subjects. He was a founder of Archigram, and was knighted in 2007 by the Queen for his services to architecture and teaching. He is also a Royal Academician and a Commandeur de l'Ordre des Arts et des Lettres of the French Republic. His achievements with Archigram were recognised by the Royal Institute of British Architects in 2004, when the group was awarded the Royal Gold Medal.

Early life and education
Cook was born in Southend-on-Sea, Essex and studied architecture at Bournemouth College of Art from 1953–58. He then entered the Architectural Association School of Architecture in London, graduating in 1960.

Career
Cook was a director of London's Institute of Contemporary Arts (1970-1972) and chair of architecture at the Bartlett School of Architecture at University College London (1990–2006), and has been director of Art Net in London and curator of the British Pavilion at the Venice Architecture Biennale. He continues to curate, organise and exhibit around the world: in Seoul, LA, Cyprus, the Centre Georges Pompidou, Design Museum, Louisiana Museum of Modern Art, as well as in castles, sheds and garages.

He is a Senior Fellow of the Royal College of Art, London. Cook's professorships include those of the Royal Academy, University College, London and the Hochschule fur Bildende Kunste (Städelschule) in Frankfurt-Main, Germany.

Cook has built in Osaka, Nagoya, Berlin and Madrid. However it was construction of his arts building in 2003, the Kunsthaus Graz (aka 'The Friendly Alien') in Graz, Austria (with Colin Fournier), that brought his work to a wider public.

He practiced from 2007 to 2019 with Gavin Robotham at CRAB (Cook Robotham Architectural Bureau Ltd). In 2013 he (along with his studio CRAB) completed the Vienna University of Economics and Business's new law faculty  and Australia's newest school of architecture, the Abedian School of Architecture at Bond University on the Gold Coast.

Cook was awarded a knighthood in the Queen's 2007 Birthday Honours List, for services to architecture.

His first building in the UK, a new drawing studio at the Arts University Bournemouth was opened by Zaha Hadid in March 2016. He also built the innovation studio at the Arts University Bournemouth, which was opened by Odile Decq in 2021.

Cook currently practices with Erlend Blakstad Haffner at CHAP (Cook Haffner Architecture Platform Ltd). CHAP has offices in London, Belgrade and Oslo.

Awards and honours

1960 – Henry Florence Student A.A. (Building Centre research Scholar)
1961 – Piccadilly Circus competition (Mention)
1962 – Gas Council House Design (First Prize)
1965 – Selected as one of "Young British Designers" Sunday Times exhibition
1996 – Jean Tschumi Medal, International Union of Architects
1969 – Grant awarded by Graham Foundation, Chicago, for Instant City
2000 – Kunsthaus Graz, Austria (with Colin Fournier)
2002 – Annie Spink Award, jointly awarded to David Greene (for contribution to architectural education) by the RIBA
2002 – Royal Gold Medal (with Archigram) by RIBA
2003 – Commandeur de l'Ordre des Arts et des Lettres of the France Republic
2004 – Finalist for Stirling Prize for Kunsthaus Graz (with Colin Fournier)
2007 – Knighted in Queen's Honours' list (for services in architecture)
2008 – Senior Fellow of the Royal College of Art, London
2010 – Mario Pani Award for Architecture, Mexico City
2010 – Honorary Doctorate of Technology, Lund University, Sweden

Success in architectural competitions

1970 – Monte Carlo Entertainments Centre (with Archigram)
1990 – Solar Housing, Landstuhl, Germany (with Christine Hawley)
1992 – Museum of Antiquities, Austria (with Christine Hawley)
2000 – The Kunsthaus, Graz (with Colin Fournier)
2006 – New Theatre Verbania, Italy (with Gavin Robotham)
2009 – Faculty of Law (D3) and Central Administration (AD), Vienna Business and Economics University (with Gavin Robotham)
2010 – 2nd prize in the Taiwan Tower international competition (with Gavin Robotham)
2011 – Soheil Abedian School of Architecture, Bond University on the Gold Coast, Australia (with Gavin Robotham and Brit Andresen)
2013 – Finalist in the National Stadium of Israel (CRAB + POPULOUS) 
2013 – Finalist in the Gold Coast Cultural Precinct

Current appointments
Professor Emeritus at University College London
Professor of Architecture at the Royal Academy of Arts
Life Professor at the Hochschule fur Bildende Kunste (Städelschule) Frankfurt-Main
Senior Fellow of the Royal College of Art, London
Honorary Fellow of the Arts University Bournemouth
Member of the Hessische Architektenkammer
Member of the RIBA, Architects Registration Board (ARB)
Fellow of University College London

Exhibitions
Archigram exhibition – 1994 onwards: Vienna, Paris, New York, London, Pasadena, Chicago, Milan, Hamburg, Seoul, Mito, Taipei, Winnipeg, Zurich, Cracow, Zaragoza, Brussels, Rotterdam.
Curator of Venice Biennale of Architecture British Pavilion 2004, Cyprus Pavilion 2006
Personal exhibitions – various dates: Los Angeles, Tokyo, Oslo, Berlin, Osaka, Frankfurt,

Publications
1967 – Architecture: Action and Plan. London: Studio Vista.
1970 – Experimental Architecture. London/New York: Studio Vista/Universal Books.
1972 – Archigram. London: Studio Vista/Reinhold, Birkhauser
1975 – Melting Architecture. London: Peter Cook, (published to accompany Art Net exhibition).
1976 – Art Net The Rally: Forty London Architects . London: Art Net/Peter Cook, (published to accompany Art Net exhibition).
1976 – Arcadia: The Search for the Perfect Suburb. London: Art Net/Peter Cook.
1980 – (with Christine Hawley). Six Houses. London: AA Publications, (published to accompany exhibition at the Architectural Association).
1983 – (with Barbara Goldstein). Los Angeles Now. London: AA Publications, (published to accompany exhibition at the Architectural Association).
1985 – Peter Cook – 21 Years, 21 Ideas. London: AA Publications, (foreword by Banham, Reyner and narrative by Hawley, Christine; published to accompany exhibition at the Architectural Association).
1985 – (editor with Olive Brown). Lebbeus Woods. London: AA Publications, 1985, (published to accompany exhibition at the Architectural Association).
1987 – (with Christine Hawley). Cities. London: Fisher Fine Arts, (published to accompany exhibition at the Fischer Fine Arts).
1989 – Peter Cook 1961–89. A+U.
1991 – (with Rosie Llewellyn-Jones). New Spirit in Architecture. New York: Rizzoli.
1993 – Six Conversations. London: Academy Editions, (Architectural Monographs Special Issue, No. 28).
1996 – Primer. London: Academy Editions.
1999 – Archigram. London/New York: Princeton Architectural Press (also in Japanese, German, Chinese)
1999 – (with John Hedjuk and Helene Binet). The House of the Book: Building, Zvi Hecker. London: Black Dog.
1999 – (with Neil Spiller). The Power of Contemporary Architecture. London: Academy Editions.
2000 – Bartlett Book of Ideas. London: Bartlett School of Architecture.
2001 – (with others). The Paradox of Contemporary Architecture. Chichester: Wiley-Academy.
2003 – The City, Seen As A Garden Of Ideas. New York: Monacelli.
2008 – Drawing: The Motive Force of Architecture. Chichester: Wiley.
2014 – Drawing: The Motive Force of Architecture. Second Edition: Wiley.
2016 - Architecture Workbook: Design through Motive. Chichester: Wiley.
2021 - Lives in Architecture: Peter Cook. London: RIBA Publishing.

References

 Interview with Peter Cook on Archinect – Conversation with Peter Cook on the State of Things
 Simon Sadler, Archigram: Architecture without Architecture, Cambridge, Mass.: MIT Press, 2005 
 Interview with Designboom

External links

The Bartlett: Peter Cook
Arcspace: Kunsthaus Graz
Knighthood: Peter Cook (06/2007)
Archinect interview (06/2008)
Architectural Record interview (2007)
RA interview (2005)
Designboom interview (09/2002)
Design Museum: Archigram
CHAP
 El País (spanish journal) interview (2011)
 Profile on Royal Academy of Arts Collections
 Interview with Peter Cook about - What is architecture?, 2014

1936 births
Living people
Architects from Essex
Academics of University College London
People from Southend-on-Sea
Knights Bachelor
Royal Academicians
Alumni of Arts University Bournemouth
Alumni of the Architectural Association School of Architecture